DWYN (99.1 FM), broadcasting as 99.1 Love Radio, is a radio station owned and operated by Manila Broadcasting Company. Its studio and transmitter are located at Door #2, 2nd Floor, Ed Venture Bldg., AMS Compound, Peñafrancia Ave., Naga, Camarines Sur.

References

Radio stations in Naga, Camarines Sur
Radio stations established in 1991
Love Radio Network stations